is Rimi Natsukawa's 6th compilation album released on , and her second compilation album to centre on an Okinawan song theme.

Song sources

Almost all the songs originate from Natsukawa's first three album releases (2002–2003): Minamikaze, Tida: Tida Kaji nu Umui and Sora no Keshiki. There are three exceptions: "Basi nu Turi Bushi" is from her "Michishirube" single (2003), "Matsuri no Ato Kaze" is from Umui Kaji (2007) and "Densaa Bushi" is from Uta Sagashi: Request Cover Album (2007).

The two final tracks are bonus live recordings of songs from Minamikaze.

Track listing

Japan Sales Rankings

References
 	

Rimi Natsukawa albums
2009 compilation albums
Victor Entertainment compilation albums